Elijah Reichlin-Melnick (born June 2, 1984) is an American politician who served as a member of the New York State Senate for the 38th district, which includes most of Rockland County and parts of Westchester County. He succeeded David Carlucci.

Early life and education 
Reichlin-Melnick was born and raised in Nyack, New York. He attended Nyack High School and earned a Bachelor of Arts degree in history from Cornell University in 2006. He later earned a master's degree in city and regional planning, with a concentration in housing and real estate, from Rutgers University in 2015.

Career

Early career 
After receiving his bachelor's degree, he spent two years as an elementary school teacher at Dwight Elementary School in New Haven, Connecticut. He later served on the Nyack Village Planning Board and was elected vice president of the Rockland County Young Democrats and chairman of the Nyack Democratic Committee. He was an active member of the Nyack NAACP and the Nyack Tree Committee. After leaving Dwight Elementary School, Reichlin-Melnick began working as a constituent service specialist and district representative for Congressman Eliot Engel and Congresswoman Nita Lowey until 2013. After working in Congress, Reichlin-Melnick completed his master's degree, he worked as the executive assistant for Orangetown, New York Town Supervisor Andy Stewart. He later worked as the legislative director for New York State Senator James Skoufis.

Nyack Village Board 
In April 2017, Reichlin-Melnick was appointed to the Nyack Village Board to fill a vacancy left by Doug Foster. On November 7, 2017, Reichlin-Melnick was elected to a two-year term on the Village Board and was subsequently re-elected on November 3, 2019.

New York State Senate 
On December 17, 2019, Reichlin-Melnick announced his candidacy for district 38 in the New York State Senate. On June 23, 2020, Reichlin-Melnick defeated Clarkstown Town Clerk Justin Sweet and Spring Valley Trustee Eudson Francois in the Democratic primary election. On November 3, 2020, he defeated Republican nominee Bill Weber. On November 8, 2022, Weber defeated Reichlin-Melnick in a rematch.

Election history

References 

Living people
1984 births
Cornell University alumni
Rutgers University alumni
People from Nyack, New York
Democratic Party New York (state) state senators
People from Rockland County, New York
Nyack High School alumni